"Memphis Bleek Is..." is the debut single from Memphis Bleek, it was from his first album, Coming of Age. The song was perceived as an indirect diss to Nas. It was considered a Nas diss because the song had a similar concept to that of Nas' song, "Nas Is Like." The song became a minor hit and allowed Bleek to be known as more than Jay-Z's sidekick.

Charts

References

External links

1999 debut singles
Memphis Bleek songs
Song recordings produced by Swizz Beatz
Roc-A-Fella Records singles
Songs written by Jay-Z
Def Jam Recordings singles
1999 songs
Songs written by Swizz Beatz